Matías Romero Avendaño (24 February 1837 – 30 December 1898) was a Mexican politician and diplomat who served three times as Secretary of Finance and twice as ambassador of Mexico to the United States during the 19th century.

Early life
Romero began preparatory courses in Law while still living in Oaxaca. In 1855 he moved to Mexico City, and he received his law degree on 12 October 1857. He joined the liberals under command of General Ignacio Zaragoza, and traveled to Guanajuato to join the Army. However, he was instead commissioned into the Ministry of Relations. He accompanied Juárez to Guadalajara, but was briefly imprisoned by Commander Landa. After being freed, he followed Juárez to Veracruz via Panamá. He served as Melchor Ocampo's private secretary in Veracruz, and as official in various secretariats.

Diplomatic career
In 1859, Romero published a work on Mexican foreign treaties. In December of that year he was named Secretary of the Mexican Legation in Washington, D.C. By December of the following year he was directed by President Juárez to approach Abraham Lincoln, who had recently won election as US President, but had not yet assumed the Presidency.

During the French Invasion of Mexico, Romero played a key role in lobbying the United States to oppose the French-backed Second Mexican Empire. When Abraham Lincoln and Secretary of State Seward appeared ambivalent on the matter, Romero supported the presidential campaign of John C. Frémont in 1864. Romero also supported mediation between the United States and the Confederacy in order that the United States could focus more on opposing the Mexican Empire. When the Civil War ended, he proposed direct military intervention under the leadership of either General Grant or General Sherman.

Later Government Career
After the restoration of the Mexican Republic, Romero served in the government of Porfirio Díaz and was a proponent of foreign investment in Mexico.

On 15 January 1868, Romero was named Minister of the Treasury by President Benito Juárez. In May of that year, he was returned to Washington to complete the treaties which he had initiated in his previous assignment. Treaties signed pertain to claims of Mexican citizens against the U.S. and vice versa, citizenship, and consular matters. By 1 August his work on those treaties was concluded, and he returned to Mexico, as Secretary of Hacienda.

On 15 May 1872, Romero resigned from the Ministry (deteriorating health). By September 1875, he entered government service again, as substitute senator for Chiapas. By the following autumn he was named Deputy to the Congress of the Union for the fifth district of Oaxaca.

In May 1877 he was charged again, with the office of the Minister of Treasury, but resigned in 1879 from government service for health reasons.

Return to Diplomacy
By 1879 he again returned to Washington, to establish a company to oversee construction of a railway between Mexico City to Oaxaca. He was named manager of the company.

On 15 May 1882, he was again called to service, to represent his country to USA. He was named ambassador extraordinaire and minister plenipotentiary, and in that capacity he signed a preliminary agreement on borders with Guatemala.

In Washington he was with his wife, Lucretia Allen, one of the most popular ladies in the diplomatic circle. She was born in Philadelphia and was educated partly in New York City.

From May to October 1883, Romero traveled across Europe as Mexican representative.

Romero died in New York City in 1898.

Works
 Diario personal 1855-1865.
 Correspondencia de la Legación Mexicana en Washington durante la Intervención Extranjera. 1860-1868. 
 El Estado de Oaxaca 
 Mexico and the United States

Notes

Further reading
 Robert Ryal Miller, "Matias Romero: Mexican Minister to the United States during the Juarez-Maximilian Era," Hispanic American Historical Review (1965) 45#2 pp. 228–245 in JSTOR
 Thomas D. Schoonover, ed., Mexican Lobby: Matías Romero in Washington 1861--1867 (UP of Kentucky, 2015).

External links

1837 births
1898 deaths
People from Oaxaca City
Ambassadors of Mexico to the United States
Mexican Secretaries of Finance
Porfiriato